Benjamin Tucker Tanner (December 25, 1835 – January 14, 1923) was an American clergyman and editor. He served as a bishop in the African Methodist Episcopal Church from 1886, and founded The Christian Recorder (see Early American Methodist newspapers), an important early African American newspaper.

He was born to Hugh and Isabella Tanner in Pittsburgh, Pennsylvania. He studied for five years at Avery College, paying his expenses by working as a barber. As a student in Pittsburgh, his classmates included Jeremiah A. Brown, Thomas Morris Chester, and James T. Bradford.

He then studied for three years at Western Theological Seminary. At twenty five he was appointed to Sacramento by Bishop Daniel A. Payne, but he could not afford to go, so he moved to Washington, D. C. where he organized a Sunday School for freed slaves in the Navy Yard with the permission of Admiral John A. Dahlgren. In 1863 he became pastor of a church in Georgetown. In 1866 he moved to a large church in Baltimore. Shortly later he was appointed principal of the Annual Conference School at Fredericktown, Maryland, and he organized a common school under the auspices of the Freedmen's Bureau. In 1868 he was elected chief secretary of the general conference of the AME church and founded and became editor of the church newspaper, the Christian Recorder, a role he served for 16 years. In 1870 he was given an A. M. degree by Avery College and in the 1870s he was given an honorary D. D. by Wilberforce University. In 1884 he was made editor of the A. M. E. Review, and he was the author of a number of books and pamphlets in the 1870s and 1880s, including: 'Apology for African Methodism;' 'The Negro's Origin; and Is He Cursed of God,' 'An Outline of our History and Government;' 'The Negro, African and American.'

In 1889, Tanner was focused on missionary work in Haiti and William B. Derrick was serving as mission secretary. In August, it was found that the mission treasury was empty. AME leader, Daniel A. Payne demanded of Derrick what had happened to the funds. Derrick had been giving money to the Haitian mission in cash, which was not in itself a cause of trouble, but may have led to misuse of the funds. Tanner was hesitant to settle the dispute, but Derrick improved his place in the view of the AME leaders over the next few years and the pair reconciled.

He was a participant in the March 5, 1897, meeting to celebrate the memory of Frederick Douglass which founded the American Negro Academy led by Alexander Crummell. Until 1905, he was a participating member of this first major African American learned society, which was led by scholars, activist, editors, and bishops like Tanner.  It refuted racist scholarship, promoted black claims to individual, social, and political equality, and studied the history and sociology of African American life.  Tanner was the father of artist Henry Ossawa Tanner and the physician Halle Tanner Dillon Johnson, and the grandfather of Sadie Tanner Mossell Alexander. Tanner died on January 14, 1923, in Washington, D.C.

References 

W. Seraille, Fire in His Heart: Bishop Benjamin Tucker Tanner and the A.M.E. Church, Univ. of Tennessee Press, 1998

1835 births
1923 deaths
African Methodist Episcopal Church clergy
Tanner family of Pennsylvania
Religious leaders from Pittsburgh
Western Theological Seminary alumni